Zarcero is a district of the Zarcero canton, in the Alajuela province of Costa Rica.

History 

Zarcero was granted the title of "ciudad" (city) by a law on 24 July 1918.

Geography 
Zarcero has an area of  km² and an elevation of  metres.

It is located in the Cordillera Central (Central Mountain Range) of Costa Rica, 50 kilometers northwest of the provincial capital city of Alajuela and 27 kilometers southeast of Ciudad Quesada.

Zarcero, known for its brisk mountain climate, lies in a dairy and agricultural area also noted for the local enterprises that practice organic farming. Distinctive jams, cheese and other dairy products are among the items produced.

Locations
 Barrios (neighborhoods): Cantarranas, Santa Teresita

Demographics 

For the 2011 census, Zarcero had a population of  inhabitants.

Transportation

Road transportation 
The district is covered by the following road routes:
 National Route 141
 National Route 741

Places of interest
Parque Francisco Alvarado: The park sits in front of the church at the town center. It is noted for its topiary garden produced and maintained by Evangelista Blanco since the 1960s. Shrubs in the park have been trimmed into the shapes of various animals, including some that are quite abstract and bizarre.

Iglesia de San Rafael: Zarcero's pink and blue church was constructed in 1895. The interior features very nice paintings of the stations of the cross. Materials for the construction of the church are not what they seem. Columns are painted to look like marble, and the exterior is metal siding, not brick as it appears.

External links
Municipality of Zarcero
Zarcero as it looked in 1988
Photos of Zarcero

References 

Districts of Alajuela Province
Populated places in Alajuela Province